Flashing Swords! is a series of fantasy anthologies published by Dell Books from 1973 to 1981 under the editorship of Lin Carter. It showcased the heroic fantasy work of the members of the Swordsmen and Sorcerers' Guild of America (SAGA), a somewhat informal literary group active from the 1960s to the 1980s, of which Carter was the guiding force. Most of the important sword and sorcery writers at the time of the group’s founding were members; later, membership was extended to other fantasy authors.

Summary
The Flashing Swords! series provides a cross-section of the heroic fantasy of the period. Carter and SAGA also sponsored The Gandalf Award from 1974-1981. With the collapse of Carter’s health in the 1980s the anthology series, the Gandalf award, and likely SAGA itself all went into abeyance.

A revival of the series edited by Carter's literary executor Robert M. Price was projected, with the first volume, Lin Carter's Flashing Swords! #6 published (briefly) by Pulp Hero Press in July, 2020. Due to an introduction found objectionable by some of the authors whose works were included, the publisher delisted the book a few days after publication. A second edition of the volume, retaining just three of its twelve stories and adding seven more, was eventually issued by Timaios Press in January, 2021.

Contents
In all, twenty-three stories by fifteen authors were published in the original five-volume series, all of them for the first time. These included two "Fafhrd and the Gray Mouser" stories by Fritz Leiber (in #1 and #3), two "Dying Earth" stories by Jack Vance (in #1 and #4), the first two parts of the novel The Merman's Children by Poul Anderson (also in #1 and #4), two "Amalric the Mangod" stories by Lin Carter (in #1 and #3), a "Pusad" tale and the first part of the novel The Incorporated Knight by L. Sprague de Camp (in #2 and #3, respectively), two "Elric of Melniboné" stories by Michael Moorcock (in #2 and #4), two "Witch World" stories by Andre Norton (in #2 and #3), two "Brak the Barbarian" stories by John Jakes (in #2 and #4), one story by Avram Davidson (in #3), a "Deryni" story by Katherine Kurtz (in #4), a "Dilvish" story by Roger Zelazny (in #5), a story by C. J. Cherryh (in #5), a story by Diane Duane (in #5), an "Ebenezum" story by Craig Shaw Gardner (in #5), and a story by Tanith Lee (in #5).

The two versions of Flashing Swords! #6 together contained nineteen additional stories by eighteen authors, including two by Steve Dilks, two by Robert M. Price, one by Lin Carter with Robert M. Price, and one each by Glynn Owen Barrass, Cliff Biggers, Adrian Cole, Pierre V. Comtois, Jason Ross Cummings, Clayton L. Hinkle, Wayne Judge, Paul R. McNamee, D.M. Ritzlin, Charles R. Rutledge, Frank Schildiner, Richard Toogood, Santiago del Dardano Turann, and Glen Usher with Steve Lines. The only stories common to the two editions are one of the solo pieces by Price, the piece by Toogood, and the piece by Usher and Lines. The piece by Hinkle is a graphic novella.

Books
 Flashing Swords! #1 (1973)
 Flashing Swords! #2 (1973)
 Flashing Swords! #3: Warriors and Wizards (1976)
Flashing Swords! #4: Barbarians and Black Magicians (1977)
 Flashing Swords! #5: Demons and Daggers (1981)
 Lin Carter's Flashing Swords! #6 (original version) (2020)
 Lin Carter's Flashing Swords! #6 (revised version) (2021)

Relation to other works
A precursor of the series was Swords Against Tomorrow, edited by Robert Hoskins (Signet Books, 1970), an anthology which included pieces by four of the eight SAGA members of that time.

Before producing the two versions of Flashing Swords! #6 Robert M. Price  edited a similar Sword and Sorcery anthology, The Mighty Warriors (Ulthar Press, 2018), showcasing some of the same authors whose works appeared in his Flashing Swords! volumes.

Of the stories slated for the original version of Flashing Swords! #6 that were not carried over into the revised version, D. M. Ritzlin's "A Twisted Branch of Yggdrasil was subsequently published in his collection Necromancy in Nilztiria (DMR Books, 2020), while Adrian Cole's "The Tower in the Crimson Mist" and Steve Dilks's "Tale of the Uncrowned Kings" were subsequently published in the anthology Savage Scrolls, Volume One (Pulp Hero Press, 2020).

Notes

Sword and sorcery anthology series
Fantasy books by series
Lists of fantasy books
Lin Carter anthologies
Heroic fantasy
Dell Publishing books